HMS Earnest was launched at Leith in 1805 as one of 48 later Archer-class gun brigs for the British Royal Navy. During her naval career Earnest captured five small privateers and numerous merchant vessels. In 1816 the Admiralty sold her and she became the merchantman Earnest. She continued to sail and was last listed in 1850.

HMS Earnest
In February 1805 Lieutenant Alexander Sinclair commissioned Earnest.

Lieutenant Richard Templar replaced Sinclair in 1806. On 14 April Ernest sent into Dover Gute Hoffnung which had been sailing from Hamburg to Caen. On 6 June Earnest was in company with  when they captured Yonge Heinrick H.H. Berg, master. Then on 7 and 8 August, Earnest and  captured Frau Teresta and a ship of unknown name. On 25 August 1806 Earnest captured Vrow Luckina, Caper, master.

Between January and February 1809 Earnest underwent fitting by Pitcher, Northfleet. In May Earnest was in Wingo Sound where she captured two sloop-rigged privateers, Four Brothers (or Fire Bredere), of four guns and 22 men, and Mackarel (or Makrel), of two guns and 18 men. On 15 May  and Earnest captured Diana, D'Lieb, and Livegierne.

On 28 July Lloyd's List reported that Earnest had recaptured Vriendschap, Kok, master, which had been sailing to the Baltic when a Danish lugger had captured her. Vriendship arrived at Ystad. Earnest also recaptured Emanuel, Tygerfon, master. The prize money notice gives the name of Friendschaps master as L. H. Hok. A later notice gives the date of recapture for Emanuel as 28 September 1808, and that of Friendschap as 2 July 1809.

On 28 July 1810, Earnest captured in the Kattegat a Danish privateer cutter of two guns and 13 men. On 2 October Earnest captured Walusten, and on 13 March 1811 Voranfsehende. This may have been the bark, from Norway, that Earnest captured off the Gallopper Sand.

On 15 June 1811, Earnests yawl captured a French privateer schuyt of unknown name. The schuyt was armed with six guns and had a crew of 24 men, who escaped ashore. Then on 7 July Earnest captured the French privateer lugger Sacripan, of five guns and 28 men.

Lloyd's List reported on 10 September that Primus, with tar and hemp, Worksam, in ballast, Scaleigh, with corn,  Experiment, with iron, Columbus. with linseed. Neptunus, with timber, and Hector, with sundry goods, had all come into Yarmouth.

In June 1814 Lieutenant James Tait replaced Templar.

Prize money
From roughly 1812 on, the London Gazette started publishing detailed breakdowns of prize money. In the tables below, a First-Class share was that of commander of the vessel, unless the commander was a Lieutenant operating in company with another vessel under the command of a Commander or a Captain. A sixth-class share was that of an Ordinary Seaman. Head money was a bounty paid for each enemy crew member on a warship or privateer.

Disposal
The "Principal Officers and Commissioners of His Majesty's Navy" announced that on 18 April they would offer for sale a number of vessels, one of them being "Earnest gun-brig, of 182 tons", lying at Deptford.

Earnest
Beatson & Co. purchased Earnest on 2 May 1816 for £600 and retained her name. He also had her rebuilt. She entered Lloyd's Register in 1818 (the Register was not published in 1817), with J. Beatson master and owner, and trade London–Fayal.

On the night of 28 January 1819, Earnest, Beatson, master, ran on shore near Winterton-on-Sea, Norfolk. She was nearly full of water and had previously struck on the Haisborough Sands on her way from Hamburgh to London.

Earnest appeared in the 1820 Register of Shipping with trade London–Bahia. Lloyd's List reported on 1 January 1820 that as she was sailing from Pernambuco to Le Havre she ran aground near Cherbourg. She was expected to be got off.

On 3 December 1825 Earnest, Spooner, master, was reported to be in Memel harbour in a critical state as there was floating ice and strong currents.

Notes

Citations

References
 
 
Naval Gazetteer, Biographer and Chronologist: Containing a History of the Late Wars from ... 1793 to ... 1801; and from ... 1803 to 1815, and Continued, as to the Biographical Part to the Present Time. (1842). (C. Wilson).

 

1805 ships
Brigs of the Royal Navy
Age of Sail merchant ships of England
Maritime incidents in 1819